John Burke, 9th Earl of Clanricarde; 1642–1722) was an Irish soldier and peer who was a Colonel during the Williamite War in Ireland.

Career
Burke was a younger son of William Burke, 7th Earl of Clanricarde and succeeded his brother Richard. He was created Baron Bophin (over the isle of Inishbofin where Burke is still a common surname amongst the islanders) in 1689 and commanded a foot regiment as its colonel during the Williamite War in Ireland. He was taken prisoner at the Battle of Aughrim in 1691 and outlawed. His younger brother Ulick Burke, 1st Viscount Galway was killed in the same battle. In 1703 he obtained a reversal in return for a fine of twenty-five thousand pounds and the commitment that his two eldest sons would be raised as Protestants, after a private act of the English Parliament.

While the elder sons conformed (to the Protestant faith), the younger Burkes remained Catholic and fought with the Wild Geese. Colonel Ulick Burke served the King of France, living as late as 1757. Lt. General Eamonn Burke was a member of the Irish regiment in Spain, and died at Bologna in 1744. William was killed at Fontenoy in 1745.

His sister Honora Burke was married to Patrick Sarsfield, 1st Earl of Lucan.

Family
John married Mary Talbot (d.1711), the daughter of James Talbot (d.1691). Their children were:
 Michael Burke, 10th Earl of Clanricarde (1686–1726)
 Lady Bridget Bourke (died 1779) who married Richard Dillon, 9th Viscount Dillon (1688-1737)
 Lady Lætitia Bourke (died 1740) who married Sir Festus Burke, 5th Baronet 
 Hon. Ulick de Burgh (d.1762)
 Lady Honora Bourke who married John Kelly
 Lady Mary Bourke (died 1735) who married Garret Moore
 Hon. James Bourke (died 1718)
 Hon. Richard Bourke
 Lady Margaret Bourke
 Hon. William Bourke (died 1703)
 Hon. Thomas de Burgh (died 1763)
 Hon. Edward Bourke (died 1743)
 Hon. William Bourke (died 1745)
 Hon. John Bourke (died 1718)

Arms

References

Further reading
Portumna Castle and its Lords, Michael Mac Mahon, 1983
Burke:People and Places, Eamon Bourke, Dublin, 1995
From Warlords to Landlords:Political and Social Change in Galway 1540-1640, Bernadette Cunningham, in "Galway:History and Society", 1996
Illustrated guide to the northern, wester, and southern islands, and coast of Ireland, Hodges, Figgis, in "Royal Society of Antiquaries of Ireland", 1905

People from County Galway
Jacobite military personnel of the Williamite War in Ireland
John
1642 births
1722 deaths
Members of the Irish House of Lords
Earls of Clanricarde
Peers of Ireland created by James II